Heleococcum is a genus of fungi in the class Sordariomycetes. It consists of four species.

References

Sordariomycetes genera
Bionectriaceae